Stefan Rogentin (born 16 May 1994) is a Swiss World Cup alpine ski racer who represented Switzerland at the 2022 Winter Olympics in the downhill.

World Cup results

Season standings

Race podiums
 0 wins
 1 podium – (1 SG); 8 top tens (6 SG, 2 DH)

Olympic results

References

External links

Living people
1994 births
Swiss male skiers
Alpine skiers at the 2022 Winter Olympics
Olympic alpine skiers of Switzerland